Erbessa primula is a moth of the family Notodontidae first described by Paul Dognin in 1919. It is found in Colombia, Ecuador and Peru.

References

Moths described in 1919
Notodontidae of South America